Daniel Gerardo Denot (born 11 November 1993) is an Argentine football player who plays for Vélez CF.

Club career
He made his professional debut in the Venezuelan Primera División for Carabobo on 12 July 2015 in a game against Petare.

References

External links
Daniel Denot at ZeroZero

1993 births
Sportspeople from Mar del Plata
Living people
Argentine footballers
Argentine expatriate footballers
Carabobo F.C. players
Varzim S.C. players
S.C. Salgueiros players
Venezuelan Primera División players
Liga Portugal 2 players
Campeonato de Portugal (league) players
Tercera División players
Association football midfielders
Argentine expatriate sportspeople in Venezuela
Argentine expatriate sportspeople in Portugal
Argentine expatriate sportspeople in Spain
Expatriate footballers in Venezuela
Expatriate footballers in Portugal
Expatriate footballers in Spain